Melanothrix alternans is a moth in the family Eupterotidae. It was described by Pagenstecher in 1890. It is found in the Philippines (Palawan) and on Borneo. The habitat consists of hill dipterocarp forests and wet heath forests.

References

Moths described in 1890
Eupterotinae
Insects of the Philippines